The Fuller Center for Housing (FCH) is an ecumenical Christian, 501(c)(3) non-profit, non-governmental organization based in  Americus, Georgia, that builds and repairs homes for low-income families and individuals. It is active in 60 U.S. cities and 16 countries outside the U.S.

History

The Fuller Center was started in 2005 by Presidential Medal of Freedom recipient Millard Fuller and his wife Linda Caldwell Fuller, founders of Habitat for Humanity, at an intentional Christian community called Koinonia Farm in rural southwest Georgia. After spending 29 years of service in the Christian housing ministry at Habitat, and being fired for philosophical differences by the Habitat for Humanity executive committee, the Fullers were motivated to continue expanding their vision of eliminating substandard housing worldwide. 
The inaugural meeting of The Fuller Center at Koinonia, also Habitat's birthplace, established this new mission: "The Fuller Center for Housing, faith- driven and Christ-centered, promotes collaborative and innovative partnerships with individuals and organizations in an unrelenting quest to provide adequate shelter for all people in need worldwide."

How it works 

The Fuller Center accomplishes its work by creating partnerships that bring together churches, schools, businesses and civic organizations to build simple, decent, affordable homes for people who are unable to secure adequate housing by conventional means. Most fundamental to the organization's overall functioning are partnerships with covenant partners, local organizations that sign an agreement with The Fuller Center to build or renovate houses for families in need in a particular area.

Covenant partners are governed by local board members who are in charge of family selection and counseling, fundraising, training, managing mortgages, organizing volunteers, finding skilled labor and spreading the word. The Fuller Center for Housing headquarters in Americus, Georgia, provides publications, general support, promotional materials, training for board members and – whenever possible – fundraising assistance.

All homeowners work hand-in-hand with volunteers to build their own homes, which are then sold to them on terms they can afford, based on the Biblical idea of no-profit, no-interest loans. With some smaller renovation projects, an innovative payment program called The Greater Blessing Program is utilized, whereby recipients promise to repay the loan amount without signing an actual mortgage agreement. They decide the monthly amount they can afford to repay and the period of time that it will take to repay the cost of repairs. There is no legal obligation to repay these loans. Payments made by homeowners are put toward future Greater Blessing housing projects.

All decisions about family selection are managed by the board of directors of each local covenant partner. Income requirements vary from community to community. However, there are three basic criteria that everyone uses:  applicant need (cannot qualify for conventional loans); applicant willingness to partner ("sweat equity" volunteer hours required); and applicant ability to repay the loan. The Fuller Center does not accept government funds due to massive paperwork and  reporting requirements. Houses are sold to the homeowners with no interest and at no profit.

Programs 

 Global Builders

Global Builders are teams of volunteers sent on one, two, or three week trips to an international Fuller Center covenant partner location, where they help build homes with local families in need of adequate housing.  The Fuller Center sends Global Builders teams to Armenia, Bolivia, El Salvador, Ghana, Peru, Haiti, Sri Lanka, Nicaragua, Nepal, Thailand  India, Papua New Guinea, and South Africa (as of January 2018).

 Faith Builders

Faith Builders is a program designed to create partnerships with churches. Faith Builder Partners are individual churches or congregational committees who are seeking to add housing as part of their missions program. Faith in action can take on a variety of forms, including housing construction and repairs as well as domestic and international mission service trips.

 Student Builders

Student Builders is an outreach program for high schools, colleges and universities. The program consists of a network of youth partners who are a part of The Fuller Center's mission and ministry.

 U.S. Builders

The U.S. Builders program helps teams of volunteers find rewarding mission trips within the United States.

 Save a House/Make a Home

Save a House/Make a Home is an initiative that allows banks and other property owners to divest themselves of unwanted, vacant and/or foreclosed properties that are refurbished by Fuller Center volunteers and turned into decent homes for families in need.

Special Builds 

 Bicycle Adventure

Inspired by the walks of 700, 1,000, and 1,200 miles led by Millard and Linda Fuller in the 1980s, the Fuller Center Bicycle Adventure was created in 2008 by Notre Dame graduate Ryan Iafigliola. The ride is intended to raise money through grassroots fundraising for The Fuller Center's projects, and also to raise awareness about the need for affordable housing for low-income families. While traveling, the team also builds or renovates Fuller Center housing projects and speaks to the media, church groups and civic organizations. The ride passed the $1 million fundraising mark in 2014 and $2 million in 2017.  In 2018, bicycle adventure trips will include two cross country rides, a spring ride along the Natchez Trace Parkway (Nashville, Tennessee, to Jackson, Mississippi), a fall ride along the Silver Comet Trail near Atlanta, and a "Dirt to D.C." ride along the Great Allegheny Passage (GAP) and the Chesapeake & Ohio Canal (C&O) from Pittsburgh, Pennsylvania, to Washington, D.C.

 The Millard Fuller Legacy Build

Millard Fuller Legacy Build honors the vision, life and work of The Fuller Center's founder, Millard Fuller. Hosted each year by a different covenant partner, the event brings together hundreds of volunteers to build and renovate several houses in one location during one week. Fuller Center covenant partners across the U.S. and around the world are encouraged to build and repair homes during the week, as well. The 2015 Millard Fuller Legacy Build was held along the Georgia-Alabama border in West Point, Georgia, and Lanett, Alabama.

Footnotes

External links 
 Fuller Center for Housing Official Web site
 Fuller Center Bicycle Adventure

Non-profit organizations based in Georgia (U.S. state)
501(c)(3) organizations